Timoshinskaya is a rural locality (a village) in Tarnogskoye Rural Settlement, Tarnogsky District, Vologda Oblast, Russia. The population was 46 as of 2002. There are 2 streets.

Geography 
Timoshinskaya is located 3 km northwest of Tarnogsky Gorodok (the district's administrative centre) by road. Tarnogsky Gorodok is the nearest rural locality.

References 

Rural localities in Tarnogsky District